Philomecyna is a genus of beetles in the family Cerambycidae, containing the following species:

 Philomecyna camerunica (Aurivillius, 1907)
 Philomecyna kivuensis Breuning, 1954
 Philomecyna leleupi Breuning, 1975
 Philomecyna persimilis Breuning, 1978
 Philomecyna pilosella Kolbe, 1894
 Philomecyna rufoantennalis Breuning, 1978
 Philomecyna spinosa (Aurivillius, 1907)

References

Apomecynini